Ridracoli is a frazione of the comune of Bagno di Romagna, province of Forlì-Cesena, Emilia-Romagna (northern Italy).

In the nearby is a 103.5 m-high dam on the Bidente river, with a lake. It is part of the Foreste Casentinesi, Monte Falterona, Campigna National Park.

External links
Ridracoli Dam 

Cities and towns in Emilia-Romagna